Mega Apocalypse is a multidirectional shooter written by Simon Nicol for the Commodore 64 and ported to the BBC Micro, Amstrad CPC, and ZX Spectrum. It is the sequel to Crazy Comets. Both games are clones of Gottlieb's 1983 arcade game Mad Planets. The music is by Rob Hubbard.

References

External links
 Mega Apocalypse at Lemon64

1987 video games
Commodore 64 games
Amstrad CPC games
ZX Spectrum games
Multidirectional shooters
BBC Micro and Acorn Electron games
Video game clones
Video games scored by David Whittaker
Video games scored by Rob Hubbard
Video games developed in the United Kingdom
Multiplayer and single-player video games
Martech games